The 2018 Valenzuela Classic season is the 1st season of the franchise in the Maharlika Pilipinas Basketball League (MPBL).

Key dates
January 25, 2018: Inaugural season of the Maharlika Pilipinas Basketball League (MPBL) starts.

Current roster

<noinclude>

Anta Rajah Cup

Eliminations

Standings

Game log

|- style="background:#fcc;"
| 1
| January 27
| Batangas
| L 65-73
| Argamino, Hubalde (12)
| JR Ongteco (8)
| Acidre, Argamino, Hubalde (3)
| Muntinlupa Sports Complex
| 0-1

|- style="background:#bfb;"
| 2
| February 1
| Caloocan
| W 79-78
| Celada, Hubalde (15)
| Jomar Sollano (8)
| Hubalde, Argamino (4)
| Caloocan Sports Complex
| 1-1
|- style="background:#bfb;"
| 3
| February 8
| Bataan
| W 97-80
| Rocky Acidre (15)
| Mabayo, Ruaya, Andaya (6)
| Paolo Hubalde (14)
| Valenzuela Astrodome
| 2-1

Datu Cup

Eliminations

Game log

|- style="background:#fcc;"
| 1
| June 20
| Parañaque
| L 73–76
| Paulo Hubalde (16)
| Hubalde, Ruaya (8)
| Paulo Hubalde (6)
| Angeles University Foundation Gymnasium
| 0–1
|- style="background:#bfb;"
| 2
| June 30
| Basilan
| W 96–94
| Rocky Acidre (20)
| Reneford Ruaya (5)
| Paolo Hubalde (7)
| Valenzuela Astrodome
| 1–1

|- style="background:#fcc;"
| 3
| July 11
| Manila
| L 84–89
| Reneford Ruaya (20)
| Reneford Ruaya (13)
| Paolo Hubalde (10)
| San Juan Gymnasium
| 1–2
|- style="background:#;"
| 4
| July 21
| Batangas
| 
| 
| 
| 
| Caloocan Sports Center
| 1–2

References

Valenzuela Classic
Valenzuela Classic Season, 2018